Patrick Henry Weathers (born 1870), commonly known as P.H. Weathers, was an architect of Jackson, Mississippi.

He was born in Alabama.  He studied architecture under architect Eugene T. Heiner of Houston, Texas.  By 1886 he had done work in association with his uncle, L.M. Weathers.

A number of his works are listed on the U.S. National Register of Historic Places.

Works include:
Robert H. Babington House, 608 Main St., Franklinton, LA (Weathers, P.H.), NRHP-listed
Cape Girardeau County Courthouse (c. 1906–1908), in the Jackson Uptown Commercial Historic District, Jackson, Missouri, NRHP-listed
Central Fire Station, built 1904, S. President St., Jackson, MS (Weathers, P.H.), NRHP-listed
Daviess County Courthouse, Public Sq., Gallatin, MO (Weathers, P.H.), NRHP-listed
Ellis County Courthouse, Town Sq., Arnett, OK (Weathers, P.H.), NRHP-listed
Lee County Courthouse (Mississippi), Court St. between Spring and Broadway, Tupelo, MS (Weathers, Patrick Henry), NRHP-listed
Logan County Courthouse, 301 E. Harrison St., Guthrie, OK (Weathers, P.H.), NRHP-listed
Marion County Courthouse and Jail, Courthouse Sq., Columbia, MS (Weathers, Patrick Henry), NRHP-listed
Old Washington County Courthouse, 400 Frank Phillips Blvd., Bartlesville, OK (Weathers, P.H.), NRHP-listed
Sieber Grocery and Apartment Hotel, 1305-1313 N. Hudson Ave., Oklahoma City, OK (Weathers, Patrick H.), NRHP-listed
Stoddard County Courthouse, Prairie and Court Sts., Bloomfield, MO (Weathers, P.H.), NRHP-listed
Tensas Parish Courthouse, Courthouse Sq., St. Joseph, LA (Weathers, P.H.), NRHP-listed
Warden's House, Penitentiary Blvd and West St., McAlester, OK (Weathers, P.H.), NRHP-listed

See also
Old Tishomingo County Courthouse, NE corner of Quitman and Liberty Sts., Iuka, MS (Weathers,L.M.), NRHP-listed

References

1870 births
Architects from Mississippi
People from Jackson, Mississippi
Year of death missing